Jo-Ann Rizzo (born June 1, 1963 in Zweibrücken, West Germany) is a Canadian curler from Brantford, Ontario. She currently plays third on Team Kerry Galusha.

Career
Rizzo grew up in Germany, where her father was stationed in the military. She moved to Canada at age 16. She attended the University of Western Ontario where she won two Ontario University Athletics championships.

As of 2013, Rizzo has played in 13 Ontario Scotties Tournament of Hearts. She is also a former provincial mixed champion. She played third for her husband Nick Rizzo at the 2003 Canadian Mixed Curling Championship, where they finished in 4th place.

Rizzo qualified for the 2005 Canadian Olympic Curling Trials, where she and her rink of Cheryl McPherson, Kimberly Tuck and Sara Gatchell finished in 9th with a 2-7 record.

Rizzo is a former skip, but she joined up with Middaugh in 2010. With Middaugh, the team won the 2012 Curlers Corner Autumn Gold Curling Classic and finished second at the 2013 Canadian Olympic Curling Trials. The Middaugh rink dissolved in 2018.

Rizzo won two provincial senior curling championships in 2016 and 2017, finishing fourth at the 2016 Canadian Senior Curling Championships and second at the 2017 Canadian Senior Curling Championships. Rizzo also coached the US team at the 2017 World Senior Curling Championships.

Rizzo joined the Yellowknife, Northwest Territories-based Kerry Galusha rink for the 2019–20 season, first at second, but later throwing fourth stones. They had some success on the tour, having a quarterfinal finish at the 2019 AMJ Campbell Shorty Jenkins Classic and reaching the semifinals of the Stu Sells Toronto Tankard. The team won the 2020 Northwest Territories Scotties Tournament of Hearts in January 2020, qualifying Rizzo for her first Canadian women's championship appearance. At the 2020 Scotties Tournament of Hearts, they finished 2–5, not enough to advance to the championship pool. The following season, Team Galusha again won the 2021 Northwest Territories Scotties Tournament of Hearts. At the 2021 Scotties Tournament of Hearts, the team finished the round robin with a 4–4 record, just missing the championship pool.

Team Galusha had a great start to the 2021–22 season, beginning with the Stu Sells Oakville Tankard where they lost in the final to Team Hollie Duncan. The following week, they won the KW Fall Classic after defeating the Duncan rink in the championship game. Due to the COVID-19 pandemic in Canada, the qualification process for the 2021 Canadian Olympic Curling Trials had to be modified to qualify enough teams for the championship. In these modifications, Curling Canada created the 2021 Canadian Curling Pre-Trials Direct-Entry Event, an event where eight teams would compete to try to earn one of two spots into the 2021 Canadian Olympic Curling Pre-Trials. Team Galusha qualified for the Pre-Trials Direct-Entry Event as the fourth seed. The team qualified for the playoffs by going 3–0 in the A Event and then defeated Team Robyn Silvernagle (skipped by Jessie Hunkin) 10–8 to earn the first spot in the Pre-Trials. The next month, the team competed in the Pre-Trials where they finished with a 1–5 record, only beating Team Penny Barker. The 2022 Northwest Territories Scotties Tournament of Hearts was cancelled due to the pandemic and Team Galusha were selected to represent the Territories at the national women's championship. At the 2022 Scotties Tournament of Hearts, the team finished the round robin with a 5–3 record, qualifying them for a tiebreaker against Manitoba's Mackenzie Zacharias. Team Galusha won the tiebreaker 8–6, earning themselves a spot in the playoffs and becoming the first team solely representing the Northwest Territories to qualify for the playoffs in Scotties history. They then lost in the first game of the playoff round to New Brunswick's Andrea Crawford and were eliminated from contention.

Personal life
Jo-Ann and Nick have three children. She was inducted into the Brantford and Area Sports Hall of Recognition in 2018. Her uncle is well known icemaker Shorty Jenkins.

References

External links

 Team Middaugh official site

Sportspeople from Brantford
Curlers from Ontario
1963 births
Living people
Canadian women curlers
University of Western Ontario alumni
German emigrants to Canada
Sportspeople from Rhineland-Palatinate
People from Zweibrücken
Canadian curling coaches
Canada Cup (curling) participants